Ora Patten King (November 23, 1865 – ) was a Canadian politician. He served in the Legislative Assembly of New Brunswick from 1902 to 1908 as an Independent member.

References 

1865 births
Year of death missing